"Time Goes By" is a song by the Japanese J-pop group Every Little Thing, released as their eighth single on February 11, 1998. It was used as the theme song for the drama Amai Kekkon.

Track listing
 Time Goes By (Words & music - Mitsuru Igarashi) 
 Time Goes By (Bad Attitude mix)
 Time Goes By (instrumental)

Chart positions

Cover versions
 Hideaki Tokunaga covered the song on his 2007 album Vocalist 3. 
 Eric Martin covered the song in English on his 2008 album Mr. Vocalist.
 Juju covered the song on her 2010 album Request.
 Naoya Urata covered the song on his 2013 cover album UNCHANGED.

External links
 Time Goes By information at Avex Network.
 Time Goes By information at Oricon.

1998 singles
Every Little Thing (band) songs
Songs written by Mitsuru Igarashi
Japanese television drama theme songs
1998 songs
Avex Trax singles